MacArthur High School is a public high school located in Levittown, New York. One of two high schools in the Levittown Union Free School District, the  school is named after United States General Douglas MacArthur.

As of the 2018–19 school year, the school had an enrollment of 1,234 students and 95.8 classroom teachers (on an FTE basis), for a student–teacher ratio of 12.9:1. There were 67 students (5.4% of enrollment) eligible for free lunch and 42 (3.4% of students) eligible for reduced-cost lunch.

According to the 2007 Newsweek Magazine issue of Top 1,200 U.S. schools, MacArthur High School was ranked as #518.

Renaissance Program
Adapted through a unanimous vote of the school's faculty in the spring of 1994, the Renaissance Program rewards students who excel in academics. Students who pass everything, including midterms, finals, and regents, are hosted at a semi-annual breakfast. Students receive cards in either platinum, gold, blue, or gray, depending upon their grade average or status as an Honor Society member. These cards entitle the students to various "special perks and privileges," including discounts on tickets to school plays and dances. The four-year Renaissance card-holders of every senior class are hosted at an additional special brunch.

Music and theater
MacArthur's Music program includes symphonic band (which includes marching band), orchestra, four levels of guitar class, electronic music, music theory and advanced placement music theory, various choruses, jazz ensemble, music of the 20th century, and multiple levels of piano classes.

The marching band (accompanied by kickline and color guard) participates at football games, parades, and the annual Newsday Festival at Hofstra University. They are known as the MacArthur Symphonic Band.

The guitar program hosts an annual "Guitar Shredding" competition in which five star students of the year's class perform a freestyle and improvise solos over backing tracks to win prize and acclaim among their peers.

The musical theater program offers theater classes and produces seasonal plays and musicals.

Sports
MacArthur has over 25 varsity and junior varsity level athletic teams.  They include badminton, baseball, basketball (boys and girls) bowling, football, lacrosse (boys and girls), soccer (boys and girls), softball, tennis, track and field, volleyball, and wrestling.

The MacArthur High School varsity baseball team was crowned New York State champions in 1994.

The varsity football team has captured two Nassau County championships. The first came in 2002 and the second in 2015.

Notable alumni

 David Catapano, celebrity chef
 David Falk (born 1950), sports agent
 Bill Griffith (born 1944), cartoonist best known for his comic strip Zippy the Pinhead.
 Steve Israel (born 1958), Congressman 
 Olivia Mellan (born 1946, class of 1964), money conflict resolution coach and author of 6 books on money psychology.
 Candace Pert (1946–2013, class of 1964), neuroscientist who discovered the opiate receptor, the cellular bonding site for endorphins in the brain. 
 Gian Villante (born 1985), 2003 New York State Champion wrestler and Thorpe Award Winner (Nassau County's Best Football Player); professional Mixed Martial Artist in the Ultimate Fighting Championship.

References

External links
 MacArthur High School Website
 Varsity Football Photos from the Nassau County Semifinals on 11-10-06
 Alumni Listing

Public high schools in New York (state)
Schools in Nassau County, New York